Bernard Alvin Palmer (1914–1998), born in Central City, Nebraska, United States, was the originator and author of over 165 books for Christian youth, as well as several books for adults. He created series such as the Danny Orlis series, the Felicia Cartright series, and the Pioneer Girls series, which he co-authored with his wife Marjorie Palmer.

Bibliography

Felicia Cartright Series

This paperback series was published by Moody Press between 1958 and 1971 and consists of at least 19 titles.
 The Case of the Uncut Diamond (1958)
 The Case of the Green Medallion (1958)
 The Case of the Missing Sideboard (1958)
 The Frantic Search (1958)
 The Frightened Student (1959)
 The Case of the Twisted Key (1959)
 The Case of the Dancing Fire (1960)
 The Lonely Teacher (1960)
 The Troubled Rancher (1961)
 The Storm-Scarred Mountain (1961)
 The Hungry Fiddler (1962)
 The Case of the Antique Bookmark (1963)
 The Lost Puppy (1965)
 The Knotted Wire (1966)
 The Honorable Traitor (1967)
 The Black Phantom (1968)
 The Lone Ski Boot (1969)
 The Sad-Eyed Girl (1970)
 The Pink Poodle (1971)

Pat Collins Series

This scarce series consists of at least five juvenile books published in hardback format by Moody Press between 1957 and 1959. 
 The Peculiar Dr. B (1957, republished 1959 as, The Peculiar Dr. Brockton)
 Secret Engine (1957)
 Hidden Treasure (1957)
 Wingless Plane (1957)
 The Captive Scientist (1958)

Jim Dunlap Series

Published by Moody Press in paperback format. There are at least six titles, and all of them have been translated into German.  These are the Pat Collins books with the protagonist renamed, along with a few other minor changes.
 Jim Dunlap and the Strange Dr. Brockton (1967)
 Jim Dunlap and the Secret Rocket Formula (1967) (The same title was published with the first two books under one cover, same copyright date.)
 Jim Dunlap and the Wingless Plane (1968)
 Jim Dunlap and the Mysterious Orbiting Rocket (1968)
 Jim Dunlap and the Long Lunar Walk (1974)
 Jim Dunlap and the Mysterious Spy (1974)

Little Feather Series

This series was published by Zondervan between 1944 and 1953 and was available in both dust jacket and picture cover editions. 
 Little Feather at Big Bear Lake (1944)
 Little Feather Goes Hunting (1946)
 Little Feather Rides Herd (1947)
 Little Feather and the Mystery Mine (1948)
 Little Feather at Tonka Bay (1950)
 Little Feather and the Secret Package (1951)
 Little Feather and the River of Grass (1953)

Lori Adams Series

Published by in paperback editions by Moody Press. At least four titles.
 Lori Adams and the Old Carter House Mystery (1969)
 Lori Adams and the Riverboat Mystery (1971)
 Lori Adams and the Adopted Rebel (1971)
 Lori Adams and the Jungle Search (1974)

The Bradley Series

Published by Back to the Bible Broadcast in paperback editions. At least seven titles.
 The Mysterious Letter (1975)
 Jon and the Break-In Mystery (1976)
 Homesteading in Standing Bear’s Territory (1976)
 Trena and the Old Diary (1976)
 Princess Pat Saves the Day (1977)
 Trena’s Rodeo Rival (1977)
 The Mystery of the Missing Fossil (1977)
 The Mystery of the New Skis (1975)

The Breck Western Series

Published by a variety of publishers: Horizon House Publishers and Beaverlodge in Canada, and Living Books and Tyndale House Publishers in the U.S. All in paperback format. At least five titles in the series.
 Breck’s Choice (1981)
 Hunted Gun (1982)
 Kid Breckenridge (1984)
 Shoot-Out at Buffalo Gulch (1985)
 Trail Boss (1986)

Brigade Boys Series

Published by Moody Press in paperback format. At least six titles. 
 The Brigade Boys and the Phantom Radio (1960)
 The Brigade Boys in the Arctic Wilderness (1960)
 The Brigade Boys and the Flight to Danger (1960)
 The Brigade Boys and the Disappearing Stranger (1961)
 The Brigade Boys and the Basketball Mystery (1963)
 The Brigade Boys and the Burning Barn Mystery (1968)

Pioneer Girls Series

Published by Moody Press in paperback format. At least seven titles. 
 The Pioneer Girls and the Mystery of the Missing Cocker (1959)
 The Pioneer Girls at Caribou Flats (1959)
 The Pioneer Girls and the Strange Adventures on Tomahawk Hill (1959)
 The Pioneer Girls and the Mystery of Oak Ridge Manor (1959)
 The Pioneer Girls and the Secret of the Jungle (1962)
 The Pioneer Girls and the Mysterious Bedouin Cave (1963)
 The Pioneer Girls and the Dutch Hill Mystery (1968)

Ted and Terri Series

Originally published by Moody Press in paperback format in 1971. At least five titles.
 Ted and Terri and the Secret Captive
 Ted and Terri and the Troubled Trumpeter
 Ted and Terri and the Broken Arrow
 Ted and Terri and the Crooked Trapper
 Ted and Terri and the Stubborn Bully

The Halliway Boys Series

Originally published by Moody Press in paperback format. At least four title.
 The Halliway Boys and the Mysterious Treasure Map (1960)
 The Halliway Boys on Forbidden Mountain
 The Halliway Boys on Crusade Island
 The Halliway Boys on Secret African Safari (1962)

Four more Halliway Boys published by Moody Pocket Books
 The Halliway Boys On the Secret Expedition (1958)
 The Halliway Boys and the Disappearing Staircase (1958)
 The Halliway Boys and the Missing Film Mystery (1960)
 The Halliway Boys on A Dangerous Voyage (1958)

Books not in a series

Originally published by Moody Press in paperback format
 Del Norton in the Ozarks (1958)
 Mystery of Dungu-re (Colportage Library #432) (1961)
 The Wind Blows Wild (1968, hb; 1975, pb)
 Yukuma the Brave and Other Missionary Stories (Moody Youth Library #126) (1964)

A Career Book series
 Big Season "A Career Book" Coaching (Colportage Library #404) (1960)
 Barbara Nichols, Fifth-Grade Teacher (with Marjorie Palmer)(1960)
 Student Nurse (with Marjorie Palmer) (1960) [retitled: Sandra Emerson, RN 1966]
 The Mystery of the Musty Ledger (1960)
 Peggy Archer, Missionary Candidate (with Marjorie Palmer) (1961)
 Brad Foster, Engineer (1962)
 Cal Henderson, M.D. (1963)
 Jim Shelton, Radio Engineer (1964)
 Lee Sloan, Missionary Pilot (1966)

See also

 Back to the Bible

References

American children's writers
Christian writers
1914 births
1998 deaths
Orlis, Danny
Moody Publishers books
People from Central City, Nebraska